Lake Sequoyah is a reservoir in the U.S. state of Mississippi.

Lake Sequoyah  was named after Sequoyah (1767–1843), an Indian silversmith and inventor of the Cherokee syllabary.

References

Sequoyah
Bodies of water of Lee County, Mississippi
Mississippi placenames of Native American origin